In the 1895-96 season, the Woolwich Arsenal F.C. played 30 games, won 14, drawn 4 and lost 12. The team finished 7th in the season.

Results

Football League Second Division

Final League table

FA Cup

References

1895-96
English football clubs 1895–96 season